Francisco Méndez (born 21 January 1960) is a Cuban weightlifter. He competed in the men's super heavyweight event at the 1980 Summer Olympics.

References

1960 births
Living people
Cuban male weightlifters
Olympic weightlifters of Cuba
Weightlifters at the 1980 Summer Olympics
Place of birth missing (living people)
20th-century Cuban people